Broadcast lens in television industry are lenses that are used for broadcasting in television studio or on the location/field. Main manufacturers of broadcast lenses are Canon and Fujifilm's Fujinon brand. Broadcast lenses can be box-shaped, which are heavier and for use in limited range or classically shaped, lighter and for portable use.

Types 

Lens are generally classified into three types: 
 Studio zoom lenses, used mainly in the television broadcasting studio.
 Field zoom lenses, used for relay broadcasting of sports and other type of live events.
 Electronic news-gathering/Electronic field production (ENG/EFP) lenses, used for production of news and on-location events.

Features 
Typically broadcast lenses have:
 Less focus breathing
 Variable focal lengths (18-35mm)
 Zoom which maintains focus as the focal length changes (parfocal lens)
 Aspherical lens with fast and large lens aperture 
 Servomotor control of zoom, focus and aperture via remote control handles
 Built-in image stabilization
 Multi-group zoom lens system

See also 

 Cine lens
 Zoom lens
 Telephoto lens
 Wide-angle lens
 Camera lens

References 

Television terminology
Broadcast engineering